In mathematics, topology (from the Greek words , and ) is concerned with the properties of a geometric object that are preserved under continuous deformations, such as stretching, twisting, crumpling and bending, but not tearing or gluing.

A topological space is a set endowed with a structure, called a topology, which allows defining continuous deformation of subspaces, and, more generally, all kinds of continuity. Euclidean spaces, and, more generally, metric spaces are examples of a topological space, as any distance or metric defines a topology. The deformations that are considered in topology are homeomorphisms and homotopies. A property that is invariant under such deformations is a topological property. Basic examples of topological properties are: the dimension, which allows distinguishing between a line and a surface; compactness, which allows distinguishing between a line and a circle; connectedness, which allows distinguishing a circle from two non-intersecting circles.

Leonhard Euler's Seven Bridges of Königsberg problem and polyhedron formula are arguably the field's first theorems. The term topology was introduced by Johann Benedict Listing in the 19th century, although it was not until the first decades of the 20th century that the idea of a topological space was developed.

This is a list of topology topics, by Wikipedia page. See also:

Topology glossary
List of topologies
List of general topology topics
List of geometric topology topics
List of algebraic topology topics
List of topological invariants (topological properties)
Publications in topology

Topology and physics

Quantum topology
Topological defect
Topological entropy in physics
Topological order
Topological quantum field theory
Topological quantum number
Topological string theory
Topology of the universe

Topology and dynamical systems

Milnor–Thurston kneading theory
Topological conjugacy
Topological dynamics
Topological entropy
Topological mixing

Topology and computing

 Computational topology
 Digital topology
 Network topology
 Topological computing
 Topological Quantum Computing
 Topological quantum computer

Miscellaneous 

Combinatorial topology
Counterexamples in Topology
Differential topology
Geometric topology
Geospatial topology
Grothendieck topology
Link (knot theory)
Listing number
Mereotopology
Noncommutative topology
Pointless topology
Set-theoretic topology  
Topological combinatorics
Topological data analysis
Topological degree theory
Topological game
Topological graph theory
Topological K-theory
Topological modular forms
Topological skeleton
Topology optimization
Water, gas, and electricity

 
Topology topics